Unfrosted: The Pop-Tart Story is an upcoming American comedy film directed, co-written and co-produced by, and starring Jerry Seinfeld.

Premise
Kellogg's and Post Consumer Brands compete to see if they can produce a breakfast pastry before the other in 1963 Michigan.

Cast
 Jerry Seinfeld
 Melissa McCarthy
 Jim Gaffigan
 Amy Schumer
 Hugh Grant
 James Marsden as Jack LaLanne
 Jack McBrayer
 Thomas Lennon
 Adrian Martinez
 Bobby Moynihan
 Max Greenfield
 Christian Slater
 Sarah Cooper
 Rachael Harris
 Cedric Yarbrough
 Maria Bakalova
 Kyle Dunnigan
 Peter Dinklage
 Jon Hamm
 John Slattery

Production
It was announced in June 2021 that Netflix had won the rights to the project, Jerry Seinfeld will direct, produce, co-write and star in the film, which is based on a joke he told about the creation of the Pop-Tart. In June 2022, Melissa McCarthy, Jim Gaffigan, Amy Schumer, Hugh Grant, and James Marsden were among the newest additions to the cast. In August, Maria Bakalova was announced for a cameo appearance.

The production was granted a tax credit to film in California in February 2022. Filming began on May 25, 2022 in Los Angeles, and was set to run until July 1. Filming also took place at the University of California, Irvine.

In November 2022, Seinfeld told the press that Netflix executives were watching the final cut of the movie for the first time, with a projected release in early 2023.

References

External links

Upcoming films
American biographical films
American comedy films
Films about food and drink
Films set in 1963
Films set in Michigan
Films shot in Los Angeles
Kellogg's
Upcoming Netflix original films